CCD may refer to:

Science and technology
 Charge-coupled device, an electronic light sensor used in various devices including digital cameras
 .ccd, the filename extension for CloneCD's CD image file

 Carbonate compensation depth, a property of oceans
 Colony collapse disorder, a phenomenon involving the abrupt disappearance of honey bees in a beehive or Western honey bee colony
 centicandela (ccd), an SI unit of luminous intensity denoting one hundredth of a candela
 Central composite design, an experimental design in response surface methodology for building a second order model for a response variable without a complete three-level factorial

 Complementary cumulative distribution function
 Continuous collision detection, especially in rigid-body dynamics
 Countercurrent distribution, used for separating mixtures
 Core complex die, an element of AMD Zen 2 and later microprocessor architectures

Medicine
 Canine compulsive disorder, a behavioral condition in dogs, similar to human obsessive-compulsive disorder (OCD)
 Caput-collum-diaphyseal angle, the angle between the neck and the shaft of the femur in the hip
 Cleidocranial dysostosis (also called cleidocranial dysplasia), a genetic abnormality in humans
 Central core disease, a rare neuromuscular disorder
 Congenital chloride diarrhea, a rare disorder in babies
 Continuity of Care Document, an XML-based markup standard for patient medical document exchange
 Cross-reactive carbohydrate determinants, protein-linked carbohydrate structures that have a role in the phenomenon of cross-reactivity in allergic patients
Cortical collecting duct, a segment of the kidney

Politics and government
 Census county division, a term used by the US Census Bureau
 Center City District, an economic development agency for the Center City area of Philadelphia
 Consular Consolidated Database, a database used for visa processing by the Bureau of Consular Affairs, US Department of State

Religion
 Confraternity of Christian Doctrine, a religious instruction program of the Catholic Church

Organizations
 Café Coffee Day, a chain of coffee shops in India
 Country Club of Detroit
 Centre of Cricket Development, a cricket team; see Namibia Cricket Board
 Cricket Club of Dhakuria; see Gopal Bose

Education
 Community College of Denver, US
 Cincinnati Country Day School, a non-parochial, private school in Indian Hill

Non-governmental
 Christian Care Foundation for Children with Disabilities, in Thailand
 Council for a Community of Democracies, in the US
 Canadian Coalition for Democracies, a former advocacy organization in Canada

Politics and government
 Centro Cristiano Democratico (Christian Democratic Centre), a defunct Italian political party

Other uses
 Convention Centre Dublin, Ireland